Münnich is a surname. Notable people with the surname include:

Count Burkhard Christoph von Münnich (1683 – 1767), German nobleman and general in the Russian army
Ferenc Münnich (1886–1967), Hungarian politician
René Münnich (born 1977), German racing driver and team owner
Münnich Motorsport, auto racing team